An election to Donegal County Council took place on 24 May 2019 as part of the Irish local elections. 37 councillors were elected for a five-year term of office from 7 local electoral areas (LEAs) by single transferable vote.

Following a recommendation of the 2018 Boundary Committee, the boundaries of the LEAs were altered from those used in the 2014 elections. Its terms of reference required no change in the total number of councillors but set a lower maximum LEA size of seven councillors, whereas Donegal in 2015 had LEAs of 10 and 9 seats. Other changes were necessitated by population shifts revealed by the 2016 census.

Fianna Fáil gained an additional seat to reach 12 and also saw a slight increase in their vote share. Anthony Molloy - who captained the Donegal GAA team to the 1992 All-Ireland Senior Football Championship - won a seat for the party, as did rally driver Manus Kelly (both for the first time). However, Seamus O Domhnaill - Fianna Fáil's outgoing Cathaoirleach - was a notable casualty, as was former Senator Enda Bonner.

Unlike other performances around the State, Sinn Féin actually gained a seat in Donegal; increasing their numbers by 1 to 10 seats while seeing a slight reduction in vote share. Fine Gael retained 6 seats overall, while Independents saw a reduction of 2 seats. One Independent elected was John O'Donnell, who attracted controversy following an RTÉ Investigates programme into Irish Councillors.

Results by party

Results by local electoral area

Buncrana

Carndonagh

Donegal

Glenties

Letterkenny

Lifford–Stranorlar

Milford

Results by gender

Changes since 2019
† Immediately after the 2019 local elections, Lifford-Stranorlar Fine Gael Cllr Frank McBrearty Jnr resigned from the party and became an Independent. He claimed he had been bullied and was not made feel welcome by former colleagues in Fine Gael. He then announced he was going to sue the party for post-traumatic stress disorder.
†† On 23 June 2019, Letterkenny Fianna Fáil Cllr Manus Mandy Kelly died in a crash while participating in the Donegal International Rally. On 25 November his father, Donal, was co-opted to fill the vacancy. He subsequently resigned his seat and Manus' brother, Donal, was co-opted to fill the vacancy on 28 September 2020.

Sources

References

2019 Irish local elections
2019